was a Japanese daimyō of the early Edo period. As the son of Matsukura Shigemasa, Katsuie was notorious for suppressing Catholics in his domain, setting high taxation and assigning intensive labour to its peasants, later causing the Shimabara Rebellion. He was also infamous for dressing disobedient peasants in straw overcoats and then setting them on fire.

Although the rebellion was successfully put down, his status and domain were stripped away for misruling in May 1638. After a dead peasant's body was found inside his residence, Katsuie was sent to Edo for further investigation by the government. He was beheaded on August 28, 1638, for his misruling and brutality. He was the only daimyo to be beheaded during the Edo period, rather than allowed the honourable suicide of seppuku, which suggests the severity of his misbehaviour.

1598 births
1638 deaths
Daimyo
Executed Japanese people

References